A.D. is the sixth studio recording and third LP by American heavy metal band Solace. Referred to as "captivating from the first note" and "a defining moment in underground heaviness", A.D. was recorded at New Jersey's Trax East Studios, Mad Oak Studios in Allston, Massachusetts, and Semaphore Studio in Chicago, Illinois, over the course of four years.

Reception

AllMusic reviewer Eduardo Rivadavia awarded the album four stars, stating:

Track listing
All tracks written by Solace.

 "The Disillusioned Prophet" – 7:02
 "The Immortal, the Dead and the Nothing" – 6:22
 "Six-Year Trainwreck" – 7:26
 "Za Gamman" – 5:12
 "Borrowed Immunity" – 5:41
 "Down South Dog" – 8:01
 "The Eyes of the Vulture" – 6:47
 "The Skull of the Head of a Man" – 2:46
 "From Below" – 9:52

Awards and accolades

A.D. was given Best Metal Album of the Year awards by many prestigious organizations and websites, including iTunes.

Personnel 

Tommy Southard – guitar
Justin Daniels – guitar
Jason – vocals
Rob Hultz – bass
Kenny Lund – drums

References 

Solace (band) albums
2010 albums